Gaspard Manesse (born 25 March 1975 in Paris) is a French actor, composer and musician. He is best known for his starring role as Julien Quentin in the film Au revoir, les enfants (1987). He acted in and composed the music for the film Comme il vient. Gaspard is a composer and musician - he tours throughout the heart of France playing the trumpet with a group called "Surnatural Orchestra" from the Ile-de-France.

Filmography
 Comme il vient – 2002
 Erreur de jeunesse (fr)   –  1989
 Au revoir, les enfants (Goodbye, Children)  – 1987

External links 

 
 http://surnaturalorchestra.free.fr/ 

1975 births
French male film actors
French musicians
Living people
Male actors from Paris
French male child actors